Dogo may refer to:

Dogs
 Various molossoid dogs breeds originating in Spanish-speaking regions, including
 the Dogo Argentino
 the Dogo Canario, now known as Presa Canario
 the Dogo cubano, extinct
 the Dogo Español or Alano Español
 the Dogo Guatemalteco or Guatemalan Dogo
 the Dogo Mallorquín or Ca de Bou
 the Dogo Sardesco

Places
 Dogo, Sikasso, Mali
 Dogo, Mopti, Mali
 Dogo, Niger
 Dōgo Onsen, a hot spring in Japan
 Dōgojima, an island in Japan
 Mount Dōgo, a mountain in Japan

Other uses 
 Dogo Janja, singer-songwriter and rapper
 Dogo Beer, brand of beer

See also
 Dogo-Dogo, Niger
 Club Dogo
 DoggoLingo